= Al Zarqan =

Sunni Muslim tribe

Al Zarqan (Arabic: الزرقان, single Zarqani) is a Sunni Muslim tribe, said to belong to the family of Muhammad.

They lived in Saudi Arabia, Yemen, Iraq, Jordan and Ahvaz.
